Mimosa Sugar Balls, also known as Prasad Dana, Gol Dana, Nakul Dana or Tarasari, is a small pea–sized sweet food made up of sugar. It is especially used in Hinduism religious ritual as an offering for the deities. It is popularly used as an offering in temples in Nepal and India. 

It is generally sold in small packets. It is firstly offered to the deities alongside other worshipping materials such as Sindoor, coconut, sweets, etc. and then afterwards given to the devotees. Since, it is easily transportable and storable, it is hugely popular in most places. Its demand increases during festivals such as Durga Puja, Maha Shivaratri, etc.

Composition 
Mimosa Sugar Balls is made up of sugar. It is very sweet in nature. Primarily, it is white in colour but sometimes edible food colouring is added.

References

Confectionery
Ceremonial food and drink
Nepalese cuisine